Zeddenick is a village and a former municipality in the Jerichower Land district, in Saxony-Anhalt, Germany. Since January 1, 2009, it is part of the town Möckern.

References

Former municipalities in Saxony-Anhalt
Möckern